WBHC-FM (92.1 FM) is a radio station broadcasting a hot adult contemporary format licensed to Hampton, South Carolina, United States.  WBHC was named the "Adult Contemporary Radio Station Of The Year, 2014" by 'New Music Weekly Magazine', a radio/music industry trade publication.  Additionally WBHC Program Director/Morning Personality Kevin 'KC' Coan was named "Adult Contemporary Program Director Of The Year". The station is owned by Bocock Communications, LLC and features local and regional news relevant to Hampton, Allendale, Colleton, Jasper, Beaufort, Effingham and Screven counties. Network news programming is provided by South Carolina Radio Network and CBS News Radio. WBHC carries Clemson University Football, Hampton County high school football and baseball, and specialty programs including 'On The Beach' with Charlie Brown, Gospel and Old School/Urban Adult Contemporary Jams.

History
The station went on the air as WJBW-FM on July 26, 1978.  On June 27, 1984, the station changed its call sign to the current WBHC.

References

External links

BHC-FM
Hot adult contemporary radio stations in the United States